Eric Lima Pimentel (born 15 January 2003) is a Brazilian footballer who plays as a defender for Vasco da Gama.

Club career
Eric Pimentel joined the academy of Vasco da Gama at the end of 2015. He went on to win a number of accolades at youth level, before making his debut in January 2023. His performances in the youth teams of Vasco da Gama drew the attention of Spanish sides Villarreal, Real Valladolid and Granada. Despite this interest, he signed a new contract with Vasco da Gama in February 2023.

International career
Eric Pimentel was called up to the Brazil under-18 squad in February 2021.

Personal life
Eric Pimentel is the son of former Vasco da Gama winger Pimentel, who played for the club between 1991 and 1997.

Career statistics

Club

References

2003 births
Living people
Sportspeople from Rio de Janeiro (state)
Brazilian footballers
Brazil youth international footballers
Association football defenders
CR Vasco da Gama players